Constantin Iancu (born 17 September 1948) is a Romanian bobsledder. He competed in the two man and the four man events at the 1980 Winter Olympics.

References

1948 births
Living people
Romanian male bobsledders
Olympic bobsledders of Romania
Bobsledders at the 1980 Winter Olympics
Place of birth missing (living people)